The Leif Garrett Collection is an album by Leif Garrett released in 1998 and features all 10 of his US Billboard Hot 100 hit singles plus two additional cuts ("New York City Nights" and "You Had To Go and Change On Me").

Critical reception

Stephen Thomas Erlewine of AllMusic writes, "it's as thorough as a compilation as anyone could hope for, and while his music hasn't dated particularly well, it will give a nostalgic ride to anyone that thrilled to his episode of Behind the Music."

Track listing

Track information and credits adapted from the album's liner notes.

Musicians
Leif Garrett – Vocals
No musicians are listed in the liner notes.

Production
Michael Lloyd – Arranger, Engineer, Producer (Tracks 1–6, 8, 10)
John D'Andrea – Producer (Tracks 7, 9)
Shun Tokura – Producer (Track 9)
Tony Papa – Remastering Supervisor
Doug Haverty – Art Direction, Design
Michael Childers – Photography
Dick Zimmerman – Photography
Catherine Farley – Supervisor
Bob Fisher – Remastering

References

1998 greatest hits albums
Leif Garrett albums
Albums produced by Michael Lloyd (music producer)
Rock 'n Roll Records compilation albums